The Stella and Charles Guttman Foundation was created in 1959 by Charles and Stella Guttman. Charles was known as a successful New York entrepreneur who was devoted to and invested in socially aware public topics. After the deaths of both Charles and Stella Guttman all of their substantial possessions were donated to their Foundation. In 2013 the Foundation came up with a tactical evaluation on the Foundation’s assets and decided to donate about $25 million that could result in effective changes over a five-year period commencing in 2012.

Their proposal on the Stella and Charles Guttman Community project was accepted to make significant improvements in college success for New York City public school students. They also gave $15 million to the New Community College, now called the Stella and Charles Guttman Community College. This contribution was stated by the Council for Aid to Education to be one of the biggest contributions ever for a public two-year college. The foundation also gave an additional $10 million to the City University of New York (CUNY) with the purpose to raise the graduation rates in all seven community colleges of the CUNY system.

The Union Settlement Association was another organization that received a donation of about $50,000 for a regeneration grant to support the college transition program in the Union Settlement. The donation was put in place to help direct low–earning, minority high school alumnae from East Harlem and surrounding neighborhoods to college. Executive Elizabeth Olofson stated, "This grant is part of the Foundation’s recent decision to make a substantial investment to support college success for New York City public school students". 

Charles and Stella Guttman also supplied the Henry Street Settlement's original building with a donation of $1 million, as Charles had grown up in the area. Charles Guttman was raised on the Lower East Side of New York, where his proper education ended at the age of 13. In 1962, during the Henry Settlement dedication, Charles recollected that as a child he was shipped out of the city to the country along with Irish and Italian children with the Henry Street Settlement.
 
Charles Guttman went on to establish the Paddington Corporation in 1937, which imported J&B Scotch and other liquors.  He served as the company's president, which he founded with importers Justerini & Brooks. He owned 17.08% and 43.39% and as an executive official, had 51.17% and 98.31%. Guttman sold 83,000 Class A shares and their foundation sold the remaining with a total of 17,000 shares which resulted in the Guttmans owning 17% of the corporation’s voting securities and the foundation owning none.

The 2012 the Foundations tax forms displayed grants given over time that varied in institutions/organizations and resulted in a total of $2,058,500 donated. Some of the organizations given grants were to the Alvin Ailey American Dance Theater, Brooklyn Children's Museum, New York Needs You and others. The foundation has also provided grants to several colleges such as Princeton University, the NYU School of Medicine and Yale University.

References

External links
Official website

Educational foundations in the United States
Charities based in New York City